The 1992–93 Copa del Rey was the 91st staging of the Copa del Rey.

The competition started on 28 August 1992 and concluded on 26 June 1993 with the Final, held at the Estadio Luis Casanova in Valencia.

First round

|}
Bye: Racing de Ferrol, Deportivo Alavés, Endesa Andorra, SD Ibiza, CD Izarra, Castro FC, CD Alcoyano & UD Gáldar.

Second round

|}
 Bye: Cartagena FC, CD Maspalomas, CP Ejido, UD Horadada and Utebo FC

Third round

|}

Fourth round

|}
Bye: UE Lleida

Fifth round

|}

Round of 16

|}

Quarter-finals

|}

Semi-finals

|}

Final

|}

Top goalscorers

Source: BDFútbol

References

External links
 Copa del Rey at Linguasport 
 Copa del Rey at BDFutbol

Copa del Rey seasons
1992–93 in Spanish football cups